The Malay Archipelago (Indonesian/Malay:) or also called the Indo-Australian Archipelago is the archipelago between Mainland Southeast Asia and Australia. It has also been called the "Malay world," "Nusantara", "East Indies" and other names over time. The name was taken from the 19th-century European concept of a Malay race, later based on the distribution of Austronesian languages.

Situated between the Indian and Pacific oceans, the archipelago of over 25,000 islands and islets is the largest archipelago by area and fifth by number of islands in the world. It includes Brunei, East Timor, Indonesia, Malaysia (East Malaysia), Papua New Guinea, the Philippines, and Singapore. The term is largely synonymous with Maritime Southeast Asia.

Etymology and terminology 
The term "Malay Archipelago" was derived from the archaic European supposition of a "Malay race" (a culturally-similar non-Oceanian subset of the Austronesian peoples), a racial concept proposed by European explorers based on their observations of the influence of the Srivijaya empire, which was based on the island of Sumatra. However, the Malay Archipelago does not include all islands inhabited by the Malay race such as Madagascar and Taiwan, and it includes the islands inhabited by Melanesians such as Maluku Islands and New Guinea.

The 19th-century naturalist Alfred Wallace used the term "Malay Archipelago" as the title of his influential book documenting his studies in the region. Wallace also referred to the area as the "Indian Archipelago" and the "Indo-Australian" Archipelago. He included within the region the Solomon Islands and the Malay Peninsula due to physiographic similarities. As Wallace noted, there are arguments for excluding Papua New Guinea for cultural and geographical reasons: Papua New Guinea is culturally quite different from the other countries in the region, and it is geologically not part of the continent of Asia, as the islands of the Sunda Shelf are (see Australia).

The archipelago was called the "East Indies" from the late 16th century and throughout the European colonial era. It is still sometimes referred to as such, but broader usages of the "East Indies" term had included Indochina and the Indian subcontinent. The area is called "Nusantara" in the Indonesian language. The area is also referred to as the "Indonesian archipelago". The term "Maritime Southeast Asia" is largely synonymous, covering both the islands in Southeast Asia and nearby island-like communities, such as those found on the Malay Peninsula.

Insulindia
Insulindia is a somewhat archaic geographical term for Maritime Southeast Asia, sometimes extending as far as Australasia. More common in Portuguese and Spanish, it is also sometimes used in art history or anthropology to describe the interface zone between the cultures of Oceania and Southeast Asia.

Insulindia is used as a geopolitical term in academic discussions of the former European colonial possessions within Maritime Southeast Asia, especially Dutch East Indies and Portuguese East Indies ("Portuguese Insulindia") much as former French colonial possessions in Southeast Asia are still termed French Indochina. It is also used to describe and locate the Chinese cultural diaspora (the "insulindian Chinese") across the islands of Southeast Asia.

Geography 

The land and sea area of the archipelago exceeds 2 million km2. The more than 25,000 islands of the archipelago consist of many smaller archipelagoes.

The major island groupings in the Indonesian Archipelago include the Maluku Islands, New Guinea, and the Sunda Islands. The Sunda Islands comprise two island groups: the Greater Sunda Islands and the Lesser Sunda Islands. 

The major island groupings in the Philippine Archipelago include Luzon, Mindanao, and the Visayan Islands.

The seven largest islands are New Guinea, Borneo, Sumatra, Sulawesi and Java in Indonesia; and Luzon and Mindanao in the Philippines.

Geologically, the archipelago is one of the most active volcanic regions in the world.

The climate throughout the archipelago is tropical, owing to its position on the Equator.

Biogeography 

Wallace used the term Malay Archipelago as the title of his influential book documenting his studies in the region. He proposed what would come to be known as the "Wallace Line", a boundary that separated the flora and fauna of Asia and Australia. The ice age boundary was formed by the deep water straits between Borneo and Sulawesi; and through the Lombok Strait between Bali and Lombok. This is now considered the western border of the Wallacea transition zone between the zoogeographical regions of Asia and Australia. The zone has a mixture of species of Asian and Australian origin, and its own endemic species.

Demography

Population
Over 380 million people live in the region, with the 10 most populated islands being the following:

 Java (141,000,000)
 Sumatra (50,180,000)
 Luzon (48,520,774)
 Mindanao (21,902,000)
 Borneo (21,258,000)
 Sulawesi (21,258,000)
 New Guinea (11,306,940)
 Singapore (5,638,700)
 Negros (4,414,131)
 Panay (4,302,634)

Language and religion
The people living there are predominantly from Austronesian sub-groupings and correspondingly speak western Malayo-Polynesian languages. The main religions in this region are Islam (62%), Christianity (33%), as well as Buddhism, Hinduism, Taoism and traditional folk religions.

Culture
Culturally, the region is often seen as part of "Farther India" or Greater India—the Coedes' Indianized states of Southeast Asia refers to it as "Island Southeast Asia".

See also 

British Indian Ocean Territory
East Indies
Greater Indonesia
Maritime Southeast Asia
Nusantara
Indonesian Archipelago
Malay Peninsula
Malayness
Maphilindo

Notes

External links 
 
 Wallace, Alfred Russel. The Malay Archipelago, Volume I, Volume II.
 Art of Island Southeast Asia, full-text of an exhibition catalog from the Metropolitan Museum of Art

	

 01
Islands of Southeast Asia
Archipelagoes of Southeast Asia

Archipelagoes of the Indian Ocean
Archipelagoes of the Pacific Ocean
International archipelagoes
Regions of Eurasia
Regions of Oceania